The 30th International Emmy Awards took place on November 25, 2002 in New York City and hosted by TV personality Donna Hanover. The award ceremony, presented by the International Academy of Television Arts and Sciences (IATAS), honors all programming produced and originally aired outside the United States.

Ceremony 
The nominees to the International Emmys, were announced by International Academy of Television Arts & Sciences (IATAS) on October 8, 2002, at a press conference at MIPCOM in Cannes. The International Academy announced the winners of the 30th International Emmy Awards in an ceremony gala at the Sheraton New York hosted by Donna Hanover. Joining her as presenters were Mia Farrow, Angela Lansbury, Joan Collins and Lauren Holly.

Denmark's Rejseholdet, a police drama based on real crimes, won the Drama Series award. The Slovak Republic won in the Documentary category with The Power of Good, the story of a man who saved more than 600 Czechoslovak Jewish children from the Nazis in 1939. Germany won the TV Movie/Mini-series category with Die Manns – Ein Jahrhundertroman, a tale about the novel-writing Mann family.

British television show The Kumars at No. 42 shared the award for best popular arts programme with Channel 4's Faking It. BBC One's Stig of the Dump, the story of a child who befriends a caveman, won the Children and Young People's award. John Simpson and his BBC colleague Joe Phua won the News Coverage prize for their November 2001 report Fall Of Kabul, which showed Northern Alliance troops advancing on the Afghan capital. Canada received an arts programming award for Dracula: Pages from a Virgin's Diary, a mix of avant-garde film and choreography based on an original full-length ballet.

The International Academy, paid tribute Katsuji Ebisawa, president of NHK Japan Broadcasting, with the Directorate Emmy Award while the Founder's Emmy Award went to Sir Howard Stringer, chairman and chief executive officer of Sony Corporation of America.

Winners

References

External links 
 

International Emmy Awards ceremonies
2002 television awards
2002 in American television